David Michael Terrell (born  January 9, 1978) is a retired American professional mixed martial artist who competed in the UFC and Pancrase.

Background
Terrell is from Sacramento, California and was introduced to combat sports through wrestling, and was an accomplished wrestler in high school. He officially began training in Brazilian jiu-jitsu when he was 19 years old, being interested in the martial art after watching several UFC fights on television.

Mixed martial arts career

UFC career
In his UFC debut, he scored a stunning knockout victory over top Middleweight Matt Lindland.  The victory instantly thrust Terrell into title contention, as his next fight was against Evan Tanner for the vacant UFC Middleweight Championship title in February 2005. Despite locking Tanner in a tight guillotine choke, Terrell lost the hold and eventually lost the match by technical knockout in the first round.

Plagued by recurring injuries, Terrell's next fight did not come until UFC 59 in April 2006, where Terrell submitted his opponent, Scott Smith, with a rear naked choke in the first round.  Controversy surrounds the victory as the referee told the fighters to break before Terrell took Smith down. Smith was appealing to the referee when Terrell was able to get Smith's back and apply a rear naked choke. Questionable officiating by referee Marco Lopez led Smith to file a complaint to the California State Athletic Commission.  At UFC 62 he was supposed to fight Yushin Okami but withdrew the bout due to a sinus infection. The fight with Okami was then rescheduled to UFC 66, but Terrell again pulled out of the fight citing an elbow injury suffered during training. 

Despite an early report which claimed that Terrell was planning to move to Light Heavyweight,  Terrell was scheduled to fight Ed Herman in a Middleweight contest at UFC 78 in November 2007.  However, he withdrew from the bout due to injury and was replaced by Joe Doerksen.

On February 21, 2008 Terrell was released by the UFC.

Post-UFC
In early 2010 Terrell expressed his desire to continue fighting.

Mixed martial arts record

|-
| Win
| align=center| 6–2
| Scott Smith
| Submission (rear-naked choke)
| UFC 59
| 
| align=center| 1
| align=center| 3:08
| Anaheim, California, United States
| 
|-
| Loss
| align=center| 5–2
| Evan Tanner
| TKO (punches)
| UFC 51
| 
| align=center| 1
| align=center| 4:35
| Las Vegas, Nevada, United States
|
|-
| Win
| align=center| 5–1
| Matt Lindland
| KO (punches)
| UFC 49
| 
| align=center| 1
| align=center| 0:24
| Las Vegas, Nevada, United States
| 
|-
| Win
| align=center| 4–1
| Osami Shibuya
| Submission (choke)
| Pancrase: Brave 3
| 
| align=center| 1
| align=center| 3:04
| Tokyo, Japan
| 
|-
| Win
| align=center| 3–1
| Yuki Sasaki
| KO (punch)
| Pancrase: Hybrid 11
| 
| align=center| 2
| align=center| 0:15
| Tokyo, Japan
| 
|-
| Win
| align=center| 2–1
| Marcos da Silva
| Submission (exhaustion)
| IFC WC 11: Warriors Challenge 11
| 
| align=center| 1
| align=center| 7:02
| Fresno, California, United States
| 
|-
| Win
| align=center| 1–1
| Joey Villaseñor
| Submission (armbar)
| IFC WC 9: Warriors Challenge 9
| 
| align=center| 1
| align=center| 2:24
| Friant, California, United States
| 
|-
| Loss
| align=center| 0–1
| Vernon White
| Decision (unanimous)
| IFC WC 4: Warriors Challenge 4
| 
| align=center| 3
| align=center| 5:00
| Jackson, California, United States
|

See also
List of male mixed martial artists

References

External links
 
 

1978 births
Living people
American male mixed martial artists
Middleweight mixed martial artists
Mixed martial artists utilizing wrestling
Mixed martial artists utilizing Brazilian jiu-jitsu
American practitioners of Brazilian jiu-jitsu
People awarded a black belt in Brazilian jiu-jitsu
Sportspeople from Sacramento, California
Ultimate Fighting Championship male fighters
American male sport wrestlers